Iñaki Ochoa de Olza (May 29, 1967 in Pamplona, Navarre – May 23, 2008 in Annapurna, Nepal) was a Spanish mountaineer, alpinist and climber. Ochoa de Olza took part in more than thirty separate climbing expeditions in the Himalayas over the course of his career, and he was involved in more than 200 expeditions as a guide. His records included climbing 12 of the world's 14 tallest mountains (repeating one of them, Cho Oyu) without the aid of oxygen. Ochoa went on record as saying that he did not believe in using oxygen to climb mountains, claiming "if you use oxygen, you are not an alpinist; you are more of an astronaut or a scuba diver.". He died of pulmonary edema in May 2008 while attempting to climb Annapurna (which would have been his 13th eight thousander).

Mountaineering
Iñaki Ochoa de Olza was born in Pamplona, Navarra, north of Spain, on May 29, 1967. He completed his first climb over 8,000 meters when he ascended to the peak of Kangchenjunga at the age of 22. He also worked as a high altitude guide and cameraman. His most recent achievements included a solo climb on a new route on Shishapangma in 2005.

Aside from sports challenges, Iñaki Ochoa de Olza had another dream he wanted to achieve. He wanted to give back to the people who live in needy countries with mountains over 8,000 m part of what he had received during his life in these places. So, he wanted to raise funds to build an orphanage in Kathmandu, a children's hospital in Pakistan and a school in Dharamsala (home of the Tibetan exile). Unfortunately, he could not see his dream fulfilled because of his death on Annapurna.

However, his goal of helping needy children continues today, through the Foundation Iñaki Ochoa de Olza - SOS HIMALAYA (www.soshimalaya.org). That is the legacy of Iñaki.

In recognition of his sporting career he was awarded with the Gold Medal of Sports Merit of the Government of Navarre, his homeland. All the alpinists who contributed and took part in his rescue received the award as well.

Death 
Ochoa de Olza died in 2008 while attempting to climb the  Nepalese mountain, Annapurna. Ochoa was trying to climb to the peak of Annapurna with his climbing partner, Romanian alpinist Horia Colibășanu. They were forced to halt their climb near the summit of the mountain because of dangerous weather conditions at the peak. Ochoa had also suffered severe frostbite to his hands, which also forced the duo to halt the climb. Upon their descent back down the mountain, Ochoa collapsed and suffered a seizure near Annapurna's Camp 4. He and his partner were unable to descend any further due to Ochoa's sudden illness and incapacitation. Ochoa suffered from lung and brain damage due to the seizure. His condition was further complicated by pulmonary edema.

Attempts were made to save Ochoa's life. Swiss climber Ueli Steck, who had abandoned his own attempt with Simon Anthamatten to climb Annapurna's south face due to avalanche threat the previous week, climbed to Ochoa's position to administer emergency medical aid. Doctors from the Hospital of Navarre also tried to help Ochoa remotely from Pamplona. However, heavy snow conditions and the high altitude made all rescue attempts impossible. (Rescues above 7400 metres are usually impossible because helicopters cannot hover at that altitude and few people are able to handle the altitude.) Steck and Colibasanu were left to administer first aid to Ochoa.

Iñaki Ochoa de Olza died on May 23, 2008, at 6:45 a.m. GMT in an emergency tent on Annapurna, where he had been trapped in a semiconscious and immobile state for five days. He died from a suspected pulmonary edema, as well as a brain lesion, according to the Spanish newspaper, Diario de Navarra. His body still remains there, at 7,400 meters in the Annapurna, as per his family's request.

Notable ascents 

Cho Oyu (8,201 m): in 1993.
Gasherbrum I (8,068 m): in 1996.
Gasherbrum II (8,035 m): in 1996.
Lhotse (8,516 m): in 1999.
Mount Everest (8,848 m): in 2001.
Nanga Parbat (8,125 m): in 2003.
Broad Peak (8,046 m): in 2003.
Makalu (8,463 m): in 2004.
K2 (8,611 m): in 2004.
Manaslu (8,163 m): in 2006.
Shisha Pangma (8,027 m): in 2006.
Dhaulagiri (8,167 m): in 2007.

References

External links 
Iñaki Ochoa de Olza Tribute
 Pura Vida (The Ridge) Documentary - Spanish

1967 births
2008 deaths
Spanish mountain climbers
Mountaineering deaths
Sportspeople from Navarre
Sportspeople from Pamplona
Spanish summiters of Mount Everest
Sport deaths in Nepal